Lubbock County is a county located in the U.S. state of Texas. The 2020 census placed the population at 310,639. Its county seat and largest city is Lubbock. The county was created in 1876 and organized in 1891. It is named for Thomas Saltus Lubbock, a Confederate colonel and Texas Ranger (some sources give his first name as Thompson).

Lubbock County, along with Crosby County, and Lynn County, is part of the Lubbock Metropolitan Statistical Area (MSA). The Lubbock MSA and Levelland Micropolitan Statistical Area, encompassing only Hockley County, form the larger Lubbock–Levelland Combined Statistical Area.

Geography

Major highways
  Interstate 27
   U.S. Route 62/U.S. Route 82
  U.S. Route 84
  U.S. Route 87
  State Highway 114
  Loop 289

Adjacent counties
 Hale County (north)
 Crosby County (east)
 Lynn County (south)
 Hockley County (west)
 Lamb County (northwest)
 Terry County (southwest)
 Garza County (southeast)
 Floyd County (northeast)

Demographics

Note: the US Census treats Hispanic/Latino as an ethnic category. This table excludes Latinos from the racial categories and assigns them to a separate category. Hispanics/Latinos can be of any race.

As of the census of 2000,  242,628 people, 92,516 households, and 60,135 families resided in the county. The population density was 270 people per square mile (104/km2). The 100,595 housing units averaged 112 per square mile (43/km2). The racial makeup of the county was 74.30% White, 7.67% Black or African American, 0.59% Native American, 1.31% Asian, 0.04% Pacific Islander, 14.15% from other races, and 1.96% from two or more races. About 27.45% of the population was Hispanic or Latino of any race.

Of the 92,516 households, 31.70% had children under the age of 18 living with them, 48.20% were married couples living together, 12.60% had a female householder with no husband present, and 35.00% were not families. About 26.90% of all households were made up of individuals, and 7.90% had someone living alone who was 65 years of age or older. The average household size was 2.52 and the average family size was 3.10.

In the county, the population was distributed as 25.70% under the age of 18, 16.30% from 18 to 24, 27.90% from 25 to 44, 19.20% from 45 to 64, and 11.00% who were 65 years of age or older. The median age was 30 years. For every 100 females, there were 95.80 males. For every 100 females age 18 and over, there were 92.60 males.

The median income for a household in the county was $32,198, and for a family was $41,067. Males had a median income of $29,961 versus $21,591 for females. The per capita income for the county was $17,323. About 12.00% of families and 17.80% of the population were below the poverty line, including 21.60% of those under age 18 and 10.70% of those age 65 or over.

Elected leadership

Politics
Despite being a relatively populated Texas county and one of the fastest growing cities in Texas, Lubbock County is very Republican, having voted Democratic for president only once in the past 70 years. The county is so Republican-leaning that despite getting only one third of the vote, Joe Biden had the best county-wide performance for a Democrat since Jimmy Carter in 1976.

Communities

Cities

 Abernathy (mostly in Hale County)
 Idalou
 Lubbock (county seat)
 Shallowater
 Wolfforth

Towns
 New Deal
 Ransom Canyon
 Slaton

Village
 Buffalo Springs

Unincorporated communities

 Acuff
 Becton
 Heckville
 Posey
 Reese Center
 Roosevelt
 Slide
 Woodrow

Ghost town
 Estacado (partly in Crosby County)

Education
School districts serving the county include:
 Abernathy Independent School District
 Lubbock-Cooper Independent School District
 Frenship Independent School District
 Idalou Independent School District
 Lorenzo Independent School District
 Lubbock Independent School District
 New Deal Independent School District
 Roosevelt Independent School District
 Shallowater Independent School District
 Slaton Independent School District
 Southland Independent School District

The county is in the service area of South Plains College.

Texas Tech University is in Lubbock.

See also

 Caprock Escarpment
 List of museums in West Texas
 Llano Estacado
 National Register of Historic Places listings in Lubbock County, Texas
 Recorded Texas Historic Landmarks in Lubbock County
 West Texas
 Yellow House Canyon
 Yellow House Draw

References

External links
 Lubbock County government’s website
 
  Texas Tech University
 Texas Tech University Health Sciences Center
 Lubbock County Profile from the Texas Association of Counties
 Map of Fire Stations in Lubbock County

 
1891 establishments in Texas
Majority-minority counties in Texas